Lagerstroemia microcarpa is a flowering tree that is endemic to India. It is native to the Western Ghats mountain range, located in southwestern India.

Description
It is known as "Nude Lady of the Forest" for its soft and smooth bark resembling the "thigh of woman."

Gallery

References

microcarpa
Endemic flora of India (region)
Flora of the Western Ghats